The Greece women's national football team represents Greece in international women's football. The only international tournament the team took place in were the 2004 Summer Olympics in Athens. Automatically qualified as hosts, Greece lost all three matches in their group without scoring a goal.

Results and fixtures

 The following is a list of match results in the last 12 months, as well as any future matches that have been scheduled.

Legend

2022

 Official results and fixtures

Coaching staff

Current coaching staff

Manager history

 Xanthi Konstantinidou (2002–04)
 Vangelis Koutsakis (2011–14)
 Dimosthenis Kavouras (2014–18)
 Antonios Prionas (2018–20)
 Georgios Kyriazis (2020–today)

Players

Current squad
 The following 24 players were named to the squad for the friendly match against  on 14 November 2022.

Recent call-ups
 The following players have been called up to a Greece squad in the past 12 months.

Captains

Natalia Chatzigiannidou (?–)

Records

 Active players in bold, statistics correct as of 2020.

Most capped players

Top goalscorers

Competitive record

FIFA Women's World Cup

*Draws include knockout matches decided on penalty kicks.

Olympic Games

*Draws include knockout matches decided on penalty kicks.

UEFA Women's Championship

*Draws include knockout matches decided on penalty kicks.

See also

Sport in Greece
Football in Greece
Women's football in Greece
Greece women's national football team
Greece women's national football team results
List of Greece women's international footballers
Greece women's national under-20 football team
Greece women's national under-19 football team
Greece women's national under-17 football team
Greece men's national football team

References

External links
Official website 
FIFA profile

 
European women's national association football teams